Yemen Mobile is a CDMA 2000 network provider founded in Yemen in 2004 by the Yemen ministry of telecommunication and it is the first CDMA network operator in the Middle East. Yemen Mobile CDMA system is based on the HUAWEI Technologies. According to the 3GPP2 standard, CDMA 2000 system is fully compatible with IS-95 cellular phones, so it is normal that any IS-95 phone is supported by Yemen mobile. In 2012, Yemen mobile implemented ZTE network beside Huawei network as well as using LG-Nortel network in some eastern parts of the country. Yemen Mobile is the first 3G company in Yemen that provides CDMA 20001x and EVDO services. Yemen mobile was established in 2004 as a third wireless operator in Yemen and initially provided the circuit switch services beside to packet switch services which enable its customers to use data services and the Internet at a speed of 153 kbit/s as a maximum rate by implementing CDMA20001x which is 2.5G technology according to 3GPP2 standard. By 2007, it had become a corporation company and jumped to the top of mobile operators in the country in term of subscribers number and coverage.

Beginning in January 2021, Yemen Mobile became the first mobile network operator in Yemen to provide 4G LTE internet. In the end of 2022 Yemen mobile became the biggest telecom company according to the number of subscribers in Yemen. It had 10 million subscriber in total.

See also 
 MTN Group, GSM provider in Yemen, previously known as Spacetel and currently known as YOU.
 Sabafon, GSM provider in Yemen.

References

External links
 Yemen Mobile website
 PDF file from HUAWEI, the China CDMA manufacturer and provider

Telecommunications companies of Yemen
Mobile phone companies of Yemen